Wo Long: Fallen Dynasty is a historical fantasy action role-playing video game developed by Team Ninja and published by Koei Tecmo. The game was released on March 3, 2023 on PlayStation 4, PlayStation 5, Windows, Xbox One and Xbox Series X/S.

Gameplay
Wo Long: Fallen Dynasty is an action role-playing video game. At the beginning of the game, players can create and customize their own player avatar, and choose from one of five "phases". The game offers two options for closed range attacks. To succeed in combat, players are required to deflect attacks using their melee weapons, as this will create opportunities for them to counter an opponent's attacks. Each enemy has a "Morale rank", which indicates how challenging the combat encounter will be. More difficult enemies would drop more valuable loot. As the players perform close-ranged attacks, their spirit gauge will gradually fill. Eventually, players can unleash "spirit attacks", allowing them to use special combat moves or cast elemental spells. Players can also choose from one of five "Divine Beasts" including the Qilin, Baihu, Qinglong, Zhuque and Xuanwu. These beasts can assist players during combat, or provide passive perks to players through "Divine Beast Resonance". 

Like Nioh, the game is largely linear. As players progress in the game, they will encounter Battle Flags scattered throughout the world. Players can use them to save their game, or use "Genuine Qi", the game's form of experience, to upgrade their characters and unlock new abilities. Unlike the Nioh series, Wo Long has a jump button, which further facilitates exploration and combat. The game also features a cooperative multiplayer mode, in which players can summon a friend to help out during combat.

Story

A nameless soldier must fight against monsters and demons in a dark fantasy version of the Three Kingdoms period.

Development
On October 26, 2021, during a development stream celebrating the 40th anniversary of Koei Tecmo president and CEO Kou Shibusawa's career, it was announced that Team Ninja were currently developing a new action game based on Luo Guanzhong's 14th-century historical novel Romance of the Three Kingdoms. The game was formally revealed on 12 June 2022 at the Xbox & Bethesda Games Showcase 2022 event for release on Windows, Xbox One and Xbox Series X/S, with PlayStation 4 and PlayStation 5 versions being announced shortly after. 

Development of Wo Long: Fallen Dynasty began around two years before its reveal. The project is being led by Team Ninja president Fumihiko Yasuda (who directed 2017's Nioh as well as its 2020 follow-up) and producer Masaaki Yamagiwa (best known for his work on Tokyo Jungle and Bloodborne), who joined Team Ninja in mid-2021 following his exit from Sony's now-defunct Japan Studio several months prior. Like Nioh, Wo Long: Fallen Dynasty takes place during real-life historical events, but is embellished with prominent supernatural elements taken from folklore and mythology.

In October 2022, it was announced that the game will be released on March 3, 2023.

Reception

Wo Long: Fallen Dynasty received "generally positive" reviews, according to review aggregator Metacritic. 

The site of the Brazilian magazine Revolution Arena exalted that it is a recommended game for any fan of action, adventure and RPG games and that "It is certainly an experience that will remain in the player's memory for a long time after the game is finished", given grade 9.0/10.0. Polygon enjoyed the morale system, writing that it was "an inventive spin on the Soulslike formula, as it indicates how challenging a particular match will likely be from afar — without you having to die multiple, needless deaths by plunging headfirst into random encounters". Rock Paper Shotgun liked how it made Nioh's overwhelmed complexity manageable, "Wo Long untangles a lot of Nioh's woes, streamlining things to make the act of ticking off missions not only a joy, but a joy that doesn't threaten entire brain collapse". Eurogamer praised the setting, but critcized the overgenerous loot system, seeing it as a "leftover" from Nioh.

References

External links
 

2023 video games
Action role-playing video games
Koei Tecmo games
Fantasy video games
PlayStation 4 games
PlayStation 5 games
Hack and slash role-playing games
Soulslike video games
Team Ninja games
Video games about demons
Video games based on Chinese mythology
Video games based on Romance of the Three Kingdoms
Video games developed in Japan
Video games featuring protagonists of selectable gender
Video games set in ancient China
Video games set in China
Windows games
Xbox One games
Xbox Series X and Series S games